Events in the year 2018 in the Republic of India.

Government of India

Central government

State governments

Elections 
Following elections were scheduled to take place in various states of the country
 2018 Meghalaya Legislative Assembly election 
 2018 Nagaland Legislative Assembly election
 2018 Mizoram Legislative Assembly election
 2018 Madhya Pradesh Legislative Assembly election
 2018 Chhattisgarh Legislative Assembly election
 2018 Rajasthan Legislative Assembly election
 2018 Karnataka Legislative Assembly election
 2018 Telangana Legislative Assembly election

Events 
 National income - 188,869,569 million

January - March 
 January 1 - 
Delhi was engulfed in the worst fog of the season, with visibility dropping to zero. Flight and train services were disrupted.
The state of Telangana started providing round-the-clock uninterrupted free power supply to 2.3 million agricultural consumers, becoming the first state in the country to do so.
One dead after clashes broke out between Dalits and Marathas in Maharashtra during the celebration of 1818 victory of British Indian troops over Baji Rao II at Koregaon Bhima village. Schools and colleges in Mumbai were shut after the violence spread to the city. Riot police were called in to control the violence. The flames of riots were spread all over Maharashtra, people violating public property and stone pelting. Army, Police Force was called out. Article 144 was imposed in many regions of the state. (2018 Bhima Koregaon violence)
 January 2 - 
290,000 doctors across the country participated in a strike for 12 hours to protest against the National Medical Commission Bill, which seeks to replace the Medical Council of India with National Medical Commission. The Strike was called off mid-way as the government agrees to send the bill to Parliamentary standing committee.
Finance Minister Arun Jaitley informed the Parliament that crypto-currencies like Bitcoin are not legal tender in the country, as they are not backed by the sovereign. The government has earlier cautioned people not to invest in crypto-currencies, terming them ponzi schemes.
 January 5 - Central Statistics Office estimates GDP Growth at 6.5% for the 2017–18 financial year, compared to 7.1% for the previous year. The estimates quote the effects of GST transition and agrarian distress for the slowest growth in four years and forecast growth to pick up in the next year.
 January 6 - 
4 policemen killed in an IED blast aimed at a patrol unit in Sopore, Jammu and Kashmir.
A CBI court sentenced RJD chief Lalu Prasad Yadav to three and half-year jail term, convicting 7 others in the Fodder Scam case in Bihar.
 January 6–11 people died in an avalanche in Kupwara district of Jammu and Kashmir.
 January 8 - Law minister Ravi Shankar Prasad states that the government was committed to freedom of the press, amid criticism of press censorship after UIDAI filed an FIR against a journalist of The Tribune for exposing illegal data access to Aadhaar database.
 January 9 - Supreme Court of India made playing the National Anthem of India in movie halls not mandatory, reversing its earlier order after the Indian Central Government opposed the move and formed a committee to form guidelines about the issue.
 January 12 - 
Indian Space Research Organisation places 31 satellites in orbit through its launch vehicle Polar Satellite Launch Vehicle including a Cartosat-2 series satellite. The launch comes four months after the failure of a PSLV launch.
In an unprecedented move, four senior-most judges of Supreme Court of India expressed public displeasure over the functioning of the Chief Justice of India Dipak Misra and call for his impeachment.
January 15 - Government of India abolishes Haj subsidy.
January 19 - Bellandur Lake, a heavily polluted lake in Bangalore city caught fire and burned for nearly 30 hours.
January 20 - India won 2018 Blind Cricket World Cup.
 January 21 - President suspended the membership of Vidhan Sabha of 20 MLAs of Delhi Government under the Office of Profit.
January 26 - 
Kasganj violence in Uttar Pradesh
Pakki encounter by Punjab Police
 February 3 - Attacks on Uttar Pradeshi and Bihari migrants in Maharashtra following clashes between workers of Maharashtra Navnirman Sena and Samajwadi Party at Dadar.
 March 5 - A statue of Vladimir Lenin knocked down in Belonia, Tripura following end of 25 year long Communist Party of India (Marxist) rule in the state.
 March 12 - Kisan Long March, Maharashtra reached Mumbai. Nearly 30,000 farmers under the aegis of All India Kisan Sabha marched to Mumbai for loan waiver and implementation of M. S. Swaminathan Commission recommendations.

April - June 
 April 2 - April 2018 caste protests in India
 April 7 - 2018 Tamil Nadu protests for Kaveri water sharing
 April 11 - IRNSS-1I successfully launched from Satish Dhawan Space Centre.
 Indian WhatsApp lynchings
June 8 - 2018 Karbi Anglong lynching taken place due to Fake news spread through WhatsApp.
June 20 – Government report warns that in 21 cities groundwater will run out by the year 2020.

July - September 
 July 1 - Burari deaths in Delhi.
 July 13 - Enforcement Directorate files its first charge sheet in 2013 Vyapam scam against alleged master mind Dr. Jagadish Sagar.
August 10–20 – Heavy rainfall causes the 2018 Kerala floods. It was the worst flood to hit the state in a century.
August 16 – Former prime minister Atal Bihari Vajpayee dies at 93. He was the first Indian prime minister who was not a member of the Indian National Congress party to have served a full five-year term in office.
 Sept 6 - A five judge bench of Supreme Court of India unanimously decriminalized Section 377 of Indian Penal Code which criminalize Homosexuality in Navtej Singh Johar v. Union of India case.
 Sept 14 - Infrastructure finance company IL&FS defaulted on payment obligations to lenders and failed to meet the commercial paper redemption obligations thereby triggering panic and liquidity crisis in the markets.
Sept 28 - 
Supreme Court of India allows entry of women to Sabarimala.
Attacks on Hindi-speaking migrants in Gujarat began following a rape at Himatnagar.

October - December 
 October 10 – At least five people died and 30 were injured when a passenger train derailed in the north Indian state of Uttar Pradesh.
October 19 - Amritsar train disaster
 October 25 to 27 – India Mobile Congress 2018, a 3 days event, was inaugurated by the Minister of State (independent charge) for Communications and Minister of State for Railways, Manoj Sinha, at Aerocity, New Delhi. The second edition of the iconic India Mobile Congress event saw the participation of 20 countries, 65000 visitors, 10000 delegates, 150 exhibitors, 300 international speakers and was supported by several ministries from the Government of India.
October 31 - Prime Minister of India inaugurates world tallest statue, Statue of Unity at Gujarat.
 Nov 16 - Cyclone Gaja makes landfall near Nagapattinam.
Nov 29 - Thousands of farmers under the leadership of All India Kisan Sangharsh Coordination Committee gather at Ramlila Maidan Delhi demanding Government of India debt relief and fair prices for their farm produce.
Dec 9 - Kannur International Airport dedicated to the nation. It becomes the fourth International airport in Kerala.
Dec 13 - 15 miners got trapped in a rat hole mine at East Jaintia Hills district.
Dec 16 - In the 2018 Men's Hockey World Cup held at Odisha, Belgium emerged as champions.
Dec 17 - Cyclone Phethai affects Coastal Andhra.

Sports

January 
 Vidarbha beat Delhi by 9 wickets to win their maiden Ranji Trophy.
 Hyderabad Hunters defeat Bengaluru Blasters 4–3 to claim their maiden Premier Badminton League title.
 India national blind cricket team claimed the 2018 Blind Cricket World Cup title by defeating Pakistan in the finals by 2 wickets.
 Indian national cricket team won the ODI Series against South Africa in South Africa in first in History.

February 
 India national under-19 cricket team won the 2018 Under-19 Cricket World Cup held in New Zealand beating Australia in the Final.

March 
 Indian national cricket team won the 2018 Nidahas Trophy beating Bangladesh in Final.
 Chennaiyin FC became champions of Indian Super League for second time defeating Bengaluru FC in the final.
 Minerva Punjab FC became champions of I-League.

May 
 Chennai Super Kings won the 2018 Indian Premier League beating Sunrisers Hyderabad in the Final.

June 
 India hosts Afghanistan for their first-ever Test. India won by an innings and 62 runs.

July 
 Indian national cricket team won T20I series against England in England for the first time in History

November 
 2018 Men's Hockey World Cup was scheduled to be held from November 28 to December 16 at Kalinga Stadium, Bhubaneswar.

December 
India vs Australia test series 2018

In Men's Hockey World Cup 2018 Belgium won the tournament for the first time after defeating the Netherlands 3–2 in the final on a penalty shoot-out after a 0–0 draw. Defending champions Australia won the third place match by defeating England 8–1.[4]

Publications 
 “Republic of Caste” by Anand Teltumbde
 “The Billionnaire Raj” by James Crabtree

Deaths

January
January 2 – Radha Viswanathan, vocalist and classical dancer, daughter of M. S. Subbulakshmi, 83
January 4 – Ulhas Bapat, santoor player, 67
January 6 – Kapil Mohan, entrepreneur, chairman and managing director of Mohan Meakin, 88
January 6 – Baldev Raj, nuclear physicist, director of the Indira Gandhi Centre for Atomic Research, Kalpakkam, 70
January 7 – Shrivallabh Vyas, Hindi film and television actor, 60
January 7 – Saksham Yadav, former powerlifting world champion, 28
January 12 – Doodhnath Singh, Hindi writer, critic and poet, 81
January 14 – Satnam Singh Kainth, politician, former MLA from Banga Assembly Constituency, former MP from Phillaur, 56
January 15 – Ava Mukherjee, film and television actress (Devdas, Detective Naani), 88
January 15 – Buddhadev Das Gupta, sarod player, 84
January 15 – Raghunath Jha, former Union minister of State for Heavy Industries and Public Enterprise in the First Manmohan Singh ministry, 78
January 15 – Gnani Sankaran, journalist and writer in Tamil, 64
January 16 – Geevarghese Divannasios Ottathengil, Indian Syro-Malankala Catholic prelate, Bishop of Bathery (1996–2010) and Puthur (2010–2017), 67
January 18 – Kashinatha Hathwar, actor and director primarily in Kannada, 67
January 18 – Chandi Lahiri, journalist, cartoonist at Anandabazar Patrika, 88
January 19 – Sriniwas Tiwari, freedom fighter, Speaker of the Madhya Pradesh Legislative Assembly (1993–2003), 91
January 20 – Hasmukh Patel, architect, 84
January 26 – Supriya Devi, Bengali actress, 85
January 30 – Chintaman Vanaga, politician and Member of Parliament from Palghar, 61

February 
 February 11- Parbati Ghose, 85, Oriya film director
February 24- Sridevi, Bollywood Actress, 54
 February 28 – Jagadguru Sri Jayendra Saraswathi Shankaracharya, 82, 69th Shankaracharya guru

March 
 March 1 – Arabinda Muduli, 56, Indian musician and Bhajan singer
 March 2 – Khagendra Jamatia, 64, Indian politician
 March 4 – Javed Abidi, 53, Indian disability rights activist
 March 6 – Shammi, 87, actress
 March 6 – Indra Bahadur Rai, 91, Indian writer
 March 9 – Patangrao Kadam, 74, politician from Maharashtra, former Forest Minister in Maharashtra Government
 March 9 – Pyarelal Wadali, 75, Indian Sufi singer
 March 13 – Hamida Habibullah, 101, politician
 March 14 – Narendra Jha, 55, actor and singer
 March 19 – Kedarnath Singh, 83, poet
 March 27 – Gangadhar Pantawne, 81, writer

April 
 April 2 – Bhai Vaidya, 89, veteran Socialist leader, former Home Minister of Maharashtra state
 April 3 – S. Madhavan, 84, politician
 April 4 – Raobail, 80, Indian cartoonist
 April 6 – Raj Kishore, 85, Indian actor
 April 7 – Munin Barua, 72, Indian film director
 April 12 – Naseem Mirza Changezi, 108, Indian independence activist
 April 14 – Ram Kumar, 94, Indian artist
 April 15 – Waqar Ahmad Shah, 74, Indian politician

May 
 May 4 – BN Vijaya Kumar, 60, politician and MLA from Jayanagar, Karnataka
 May 6 – Arun Date, 84, Marathi singer
 May 11 – Anita Das, 66, Odia actress
 May 14 – E. C. George Sudarshan, 86, Indian theoretical physicist
 May 19 – Jivya Soma Mashe, 84, Indian Warli tribal artist
 May 31 – Pandurang Pundalik Fundkar, 67, Minister of Agriculture in Maharashtra government

June 
 June 9 – Shantaram Naik, 72, politician, member of the Rajya Sabha (2005–2017)
 June 12 
 Ram Chander Bainda, 72, politician, member of the Lok Sabha
 Bhaiyyu Maharaj, 50, spiritual guru
 June 14 – Shujaat Bukhari, 63, journalist (assassinated)

July 
 July 9 – Kavi Kumar Azad, Actor in Tarak Mehta ka Ooltah Chashmah
 July 17 – Rita Bhaduri, 62, actress
 July 20 – Akhtar Raza Khan, 77, Indian Sunni Muslim scholar and mufti.
 July 19 – Gopal das neeraj, 93, Hindi poet

August 
 August 7 – M. Karunanidhi, 94, former DMK chief and former chief minister of Tamil Nadu
 August 13 – Somnath Chatterjee, former MP and Speaker of Lok Sabha
 August 14 – Balram Das Tandon, Governor of Chhattisgarh, former Deputy Chief Minister of Punjab and former Member of the Bharatiya Jana Sangh
 August 14 – Chemmanam Chacko, 92, Malayalam poet
 August 15 – Ajit Wadekar, 77, cricketer
 August 16 – Atal Bihari Vajpayee, 93, former Prime Minister of India.
 August 22 – Gurudas Kamat, 63, politician, Minister of Communications and Information Technology in Government of India
 August 23 – Kuldip Nayar, 95, journalist, ex-High Commissioner of India to United Kingdom
 August 24 – Vijay Chavan, Marathi film and play actor

September 
 September 17 – Captain Raju, 68, military officer and actor

October 
 October 20 – N. D. Tiwari, 93, politician
 October 28 – Madan Lal Khurana, former Chief Minister of Delhi, Governor of Rajasthan

November 
November 12 – Ananth Kumar, 59, politician and minister
November 27 – Mohammed Aziz, 64, playback singer

December 
December 17 – Brigadier Kuldeep Singh Chandpuri, 78, leader in Battle of Longewala, Maha Veer Chakra awardee.
December 22- Danish Zehen, 24 contestant of ace of space Died in car accident
December 24 – Dwijen Mukhopadhyay, 91, Bengali composer
December 30 – Mrinal Sen, 95, Bengali filmmaker
December 31 -
 Kader Khan, 81, Indian actor
 Simon Britto Rodrigues, 64, politician

References 

 
India
Years of the 21st century in India
2010s in India
2018 in Asia